Lushan City, formerly Xingzi County (Singtze; Hingtzu), is a county-level city in the north of Jiangxi Province, China. It is under the administration of the prefecture-level city of Jiujiang.

Administrative divisions
Lushan City is divided to 9 towns and 1 township.
9 towns

1 township
 Liaonan

Climate

References

External links

 
County-level divisions of Jiangxi
Jiujiang